Julian Vila Coma is the Permanent Representative for the Principality of Andorra to the United Nations. His office was first confirmed when he presented his credentials to the Secretary-General of the United Nations on 3 May 2004.

He has spoken more than once at the UN on multilateral nuclear disarmament.

References

Living people
Permanent Representatives of Andorra to the United Nations
Year of birth missing (living people)